Questor may refer to:

The QUESTOR Centre, an environmental research centre based at Queen's University Belfast
Questor Thews, a character in the Magic Kingdom of Landover series of books by Terry Brooks
An alternate spelling of Quaestor, an ancient Roman official
The Questor Tapes, a 1974 TV movie created and produced by Gene Roddenberry and starring Robert Foxworth and Mike Farrell
Questor the Elf, a character in the 1985 Atari arcade game Gauntlet
Questor (Busch Gardens Tampa), former motion simulator ride in Busch Gardens Tampa
Questor, a small estate to the south of Dartford, Kent
 Questore, a rank of the Italian Police force